Franz Stocher (born 23 March 1969) is a former Austrian racing cyclist. A specialist of the track, he was the world champion in 2003 in the points race event. He competed at five Olympic Games.

Palmares

Track
2002 
1st World Cup Madison (with Roland Garber)

Road

1994
1st Uniqa Classic
1998
2nd GP Voralberg
2002
1st GP von Grafenbach

References

External links

1969 births
Living people
Austrian male cyclists
Cyclists at the 1988 Summer Olympics
Cyclists at the 1992 Summer Olympics
Cyclists at the 1996 Summer Olympics
Cyclists at the 2000 Summer Olympics
Cyclists at the 2004 Summer Olympics
Olympic cyclists of Austria